Brule is an unincorporated, census-designated place; located in the town of Brule, Douglas County, Wisconsin, United States.

U.S. Highway 2, Wisconsin Highway 27, and County Road H are the main routes in the community of Brule.

Brule is located 6.5 miles east-northeast of Lake Nebagamon; 30 miles east of the city of Superior; and 35 miles west of the city of Ashland.

As of the 2018  census, its population was 664.

Brule has a post office with ZIP code 54820.

References

Census-designated places in Douglas County, Wisconsin
Census-designated places in Wisconsin